The Biz is a BBC children's television drama series about a group of teenagers at a fictional stage school. The series was written by Chris Ellis, Jeremy Front, Matthew Graham and Sarah-Louise Hawkins. The directors were David Andrews (series one), Nigel Douglas (series two) and John Smith (series three). Wayne Fowkes was the choreographer and original music was composed by Michael Omer. It ran for three series (24 episodes) from 1994 to 1996.

Plot
Set at Markov's School of Dance and Drama in Richmond, it was a portmanteau show in which different students took centre stage from week to week. It showed training, auditions and performances.

Cast

Regulars

Extras

Series One
 Martyn Read as Mr Wilkins (science teacher)
 Rajan Cahn as Mr Gibson (music teacher)
 ?? as Mrs Russell (art teacher)
 Martin Beaumont as Mr Fellows (humanities teacher)
 Charles Baillie as Mr Holmes (Emma's father)
 Donna Doubtfire as Amanda (TV director)
 Lydia Hrela as Miranda (disinterested school interviewee)
 Albert Welling as Miranda's father
 Declan Mulholland as "tramp" (actor)
 Christopher Lamb as assistant TV director
 Ian Porter as Sam (theatre director)
 Norma Atallah as "mother" (actress)
 Judy Clifton as Katrina (Tim's agent)
 Derek Ware as photographer
 Geraldine Griffiths as Pam Williams (Nicky's mother)
 Jonathan Lacey as commercial director
 Tom Marshall as Tom Williams (Nicky's father)
 Zoe Ball as TV interviewer
 Ben Onwukwe as Steve Fredericks (Luke's father)
 Cassi Pool as Jackie Fredericks (Luke's step-mother)
 Ian Sanders as reporter

Series Two
 James Petherick as Mr Alexander (science teacher)
 Victoria Plum as Mrs McAlpine (history/English teacher)
 Kelly Reilly as Laura (war film actress)
 Rebecca Tremain as Cassie (war film assistant director)
 Luke Healy as Charles (war film actor)
 Ralph Arlise as Alec (war film director)
 Sean Kempton as Jamie (war film actor)
 Audrey Jenkinson as Shonagh (chaperone)
 Lincoln Ascot as cameraman (war film)
 Kaya Trochy as clapper loader (war film)
 Lee Marriott as focus puller (war film)
 Andi Peters as Battle of the Bands presenter
 Paul Barber as Gary Masters (music producer)
 Debbi Blythe as Fiona Charles (daisy-chain executive)
 Robert Blythe as Owen Williams (Huw's father)
 Sam Scarrot as Danny (guitarist in Luke's band)
 Matthew Whittle as Toby (video producer)
 Clare Hardie as gofer (Jules' modelling fitting)
 James Traherne as John (sound engineer)
 Tony Maudsley as Roy (sound engineer)

Series Three
 Michael Hobbs as history teacher
 Chris Stanton as John (musical director)
 Nelly Morrison as Rachel (musical actress & Zak's mother)
 Marie Walker as Michelle (child actress in musical)
 Coshti Dowden as Jason (child actor in musical)
 Gil Brailey as Kerry's mother
 Polly Irvin as Jude (TV director)
 Helen Pearson as Joanne (make-up designer)
 Maggie McCarthy as Bunny (chaperone & Barry's auntie)
 Jennifer Croxton as Ms McCready (actress in make-up chair)
 Maureen Sweeney as Mrs Ryan (Terry's mother)
 Justin Brady as Steve (Jules' photography friend)
 Robert Blythe as Owen Williams (Huw's father)
 Lynda Rooke as Phyllis (Huw's father's girlfriend/fiancée)
 Sabra Williams as Xanthe (TV film assistant director)
 Philip McGough as Ken Atkins (TV film director)
 Andrew Flynn as Sam Fraser (TV film cameraman)
 Mary Sheen as shop manageress
 Janice Acquah as Pippa's doctor
 John O'Toole as vagrant
 Marcia Tucker as Mrs Squire (Becky's mother)
 Sakinah Fraser as Becky Squire (school auditionee)
 Shanie Hanley as Daisy
 Ian Driver as Dan Naylor (BBC light entertainment producer)

Production

Casting
Paul Nicholls, in one of his early roles, played up-and-coming star Tim Marshall. The role reflected his own later life as Tim had to deal with attention from the press and the public.

Songs
The Biz contained several original songs from composer Michael Omer.

Series One
 Main Title: "The Biz!" – cast 
 "Glamorous" (E3) – Tim and Sasha
 "You Have To Find Your Own Way Through" (E5 and 6) – Luke, Jules and cast
 "Tonight" (E6) – Pippa
 "One To One" (E6) – Tim

Series Two
 Main Title: "The Biz!" – cast 
 "If You Want Me To Stay" (E1 and 2) – Luke, Jules and the band
 "You Set Me on Fire" (E4-6) – Luke, Nicky and the band
 "Waiting For Tomorrow" (E6) – Pippa and cast

Series Three
 Main Title: "The Biz!" – cast 
 "Just Do It!" (E12) - Jules, Vince, Francesca, Terry, Luke and band

Goofs
 Series Two, Episode 6: Pippa opens an unaddressed envelope and reads a blank piece of paper to find out she's got the part in the new musical!

Broadcast

The series has also aired on ABC in Australia.

Reception

Ratings (CBBC Channel)
4 May 2002 - 30,000 (6th most watched on CBBC that week).

References

External links
 

1995 British television series debuts
1997 British television series endings
1990s British children's television series
English-language television shows
BBC children's television shows
Television series about teenagers